Israel–Malaysia relations refers to the commercial and cultural ties between Israel and Malaysia.  The two countries currently maintain no formal diplomatic relations. While Malaysia officially maintains an outwardly hostile position towards Israel, commercial relations between the two countries do exist . Malaysian passports bear the inscription: "This passport is valid for all countries except Israel". Israeli passport holders are forbidden to enter Malaysia without written permission from the Malaysian Ministry of Home Affairs. The recognition of Israel is a politically delicate issue for the Malaysian government.

History

Federation of Malaya 
The first political contact between Malaysia and Israel was made when the Israeli foreign minister Moshe Sharett visited Kuala Lumpur in 1956, the year prior to the independence of the Federation of Malaya. He described the reception of his proposal to appoint an Israeli consul in Kuala Lumpur as "favourable without hesitation" on the part of his Tunku Abdul Rahman host. On 26 August 1957, Israel prime minister David Ben-Gurion sent a congratulatory letter to Tunku while told him that Israel was ready to set up an "appropriate representation" in Kuala Lumpur. When Malaya's bid for membership in the United Nations came up in 1957, Israel voted in support of Malaya's acceptance. On 23 December 1957, a Malayan UN delegate told a member of Israeli delegation that Malaya recognised Israel but had no intention to establish formal diplomatic ties. Despite the signs of mutual friendly conversation with fellow israeli diplomats and friends. Later in November 1959, Tunku told an Israeli envoy that he cannot establish any diplomatic ties because Muslim people in Malaya strongly opposed such relationship with Israel. In 1961, Tunku also mentioned that he was pressured by Middle East countries, especially Egypt, not to develop diplomatic relationship with Israel.

Federation of Malaysia 
The formation of Malaysia in 1963 had caused strong opposition by Indonesia. Indonesia accused Malaysia that the country was adopting the neocolonialism  principle with British support. This led to Indonesia–Malaysia confrontation from 1963 to 1966. To improve its image, Malaysia decided to appeal to the Muslim countries in the Middle East by branding itself as a Muslim country while condemning Israel. In March 1963, an Israeli company named Astraco was allowed to open a branch named "Interasia" in Kuala Lumpur. However, in 1964, the company decided to move its operations to Singapore due to commercial considerations. Despite this, Israel foreign ministry decided to send an official from its ministry to the company in order to maintain the only Israeli presence in Malaysia. Moshe Yegar was appointed for this mission from November 1964, outwardly, as head of the Israeli commercial concern, but the real intention was to establish diplomatic ties with Malaysia. However, in January 1966, Moshe was quietly expelled from Kuala Lumpur due to domestic political pressure and foreign pressures from Muslim countries.

By 1965, Malaysia became increasingly isolated from Israel. It refused to grant any entry permits for Israel diplomats, and took part in anti-Israeli activities in the United Nations. On 23 August 1966, Tunku declared that Malaysia no longer recognised Israel in the Parliament of Malaysia sitting in Kuala Lumpur while criticizing Singapore for employing Israeli advisors. In 1968, Israeli seamen were forbidden to disembark from their ships in Malaysian ports. By 1974, trade with Israel and granting of entry permits to Israeli citizens were completely prohibited. At the same time, Malaysia expanded its diplomatic relationship from just two Muslim countries in the Middle East in 1967 to all of them in 1991. Despite the hostility, Malaysia showed some knee-jerk reaction to Israel occasionally. In 1968, Abdul al-Rahman, a businessman and a son of Tunku, representing a lumber company, visited Israel to meet people in that field. In November 1969, Malaysian representatives of the Asian Sports Federation asked their Israeli colleagues to support Malaysia's bid to host the Asian Games in 1974. After Tunku's retirement from prime minister in 1971, the following two prime ministers took no particular interest in Israel. It was only in 1981, when Mahathir Mohamad was elected Malaysia prime minister, the hostility remerged against Israel.

Mahathir's era 
On 27 January 1981, Mahathir urged the Arab countries to regain Palestinian territories by force since Israel is not invincible. In April 1984, Malaysia supported the resolution at the Organisation of Islamic Cooperation (OIC) to sever ties with any countries that moved its ambassador to Jerusalem. Malaysia was also a big supporter of the Palestine Liberation Organization (PLO). In 1974, Malaysia allowed PLO to open an office in Kuala Lumpur. In August 1982, under Mahathir's reign, the office was given full diplomatic recognition. At that time, Malaysia's foreign minister claimed that Israel should recognise PLO before demanding Malaysia to recognise Israel. In August 1984, the New York Philharmonic orchestra was cancelled in Kuala Lumpur because Malaysia demanded the work from Swiss Jewish composer Ernest Bloch be removed from the programme. In 1983, Mahathir alleged that the Jews were trying to destabilise Malaysia through Jewish controlled newspapers. In 1986, Mahathir also claimed that the Jews have not learned their lessons from their exile two thousand years ago and persecutions by the Nazis while the Jews started to become a bigger monster that persecutes other people. Mahathir also attacked the New York Times and Asian Wall Street Journal as Zionist publications. The visit of Israeli president Chaim Herzog to Singapore in 1986 also sparked fierce criticism by Malaysia. There were even calls to cut off Singapore's water supply and burn the Singaporean flag. In 1992, Malaysia denied the entry of a delegate on board of Israeli national airline El Al to attend an International Flight Conference held in Malaysia. In December of the same year, Malaysia denied the entry of an Israeli football player in the Liverpool team. The team eventually cancelled its visit to Malaysia. In March 1994, Malaysia prohibited the screening of the Steven Spielberg movie "Schindler's List" because the movie was aimed to gain support for the Jews. However, after the protests from the United States and Australia, Malaysia allowed the screening of the movie but with the condition that seven scenes in the movie involved with violence and sex be cut off from the movie. However, Spielberg insisted that the movie be shown in entirety or not at all. He eventually removed all his films from Malaysia.

The signing of the Oslo I Accord between Israel and PLO in September 1993 led Mahathir to tone down his attacks against Israel. Mahathir even considered to establish diplomatic relations with Israel but he stressed that Israel has to do more to bring peace to the Middle East and the Palestinian lands would be returned. Malaysia later pledged to help Gaza and Jericho to rebuild infrastructure there in response to the Israel-PLO agreement. However, in December 1993, Mahathir said that Malaysia was not ready yet to establish diplomatic relations with Israel because Israel has not recognized the state of Palestine. Besides, Israel has not resolved the pending issues with Palestine and other Arab countries. Mahathir also accused Zionists of undermining Malaysia's integrity and trying to destroy Islam. In July 1994, Tunku Abdullah, brother of the King of Malaysia paid a private visit to Israel. When his visit was made known in Malaysia, Mahathir denied any government knowledge or involvement in the visit. In 1994, a small number of Israelis were allowed to enter Malaysia to participate in a number of conferences touching various topics. In January 1996, Israeli finance minister Avraham Shochat said that Israel was looking forward to establishing diplomatic ties with Malaysia. However, the Malaysian foreign ministry replied that Malaysia was not in a hurry to establish such diplomatic ties.

During the 1997 Asian financial crisis, Mahathir was convinced that George Soros was responsible for the financial crisis in the country for trading with Malaysian ringgit. Mahathir also made an "international Jewish conspiracy" rhetoric. When Malaysian deputy prime minister Anwar Ibrahim visited New York City, he said that Mahathir sincerely believed in the "international Jewish plot". Shortly thereafter, Mahathir fired Anwar for corruption and sexual offences. Mahathir's remarks sparked international criticism. However, Mahathir did not apologize. An official letter from Malaysia, not from Mahathir, said that Mahathir's remarks were incorrectly quoted in media. While the World Jewish Congress praised the letter and considered the incident closed, Israel viewed it as an inadequate apology. On 21 June 2003, Mahathir's political party, the United Malays National Organisation (UMNO) distributed an anti-Semitic book named The International Jew during its general assembly. On 16 October 2003, two weeks before Mahathir stepped down from the post of prime minister, he delivered a speech saying that "the Jews rule the world".

Mahathir had sent letters to Israeli prime ministers Yitzhak Rabin, Benjamin Netanyahu and Ehud Barak in the years 1993, 1997 and 1999, respectively. In 2012 the contents of these letters were made public to dispel allegations by radical Islamists that Mahathir's government had moved in the direction of recognizing the State of Israel.

21st century 
In 2005, Malaysian prime minister Abdullah Ahmad Badawi criticised Israel, although less severely than his predecessor Mahathir. He accused Israel of afflicting terrorism against Palestine. He also criticised Palestinian terrorism against Israel as impractical but not as immoral because the Palestinian people are fighting for self-determination. Generally, Israeli policy makers do not take particular interest in Malaysian affairs except during the Moshe Sharett era in 1956, Golda Meir era in the 1960s, and Yitzhak Rabin in the 1990s. Otherwise, Israel would have taken countermeasures against Malaysia through the United States against Mahathir's pronouncements.

In February 2018, Malaysia allowed a delegation of Israeli diplomats led by David Roet to attend a conference hosted by the United Nations Human Settlements Programme. This was the first time since 1965 that an Israeli diplomat visited Malaysia. Malaysia, as a member of the United Nations, is required to grant visas to all delegates who attend UN-associated international conferences.

Mahathir became the prime minister of Malaysia for the second time in 2018. During the World Leaders Forum at Columbia University in September 2019, Mahathir defended his anti-Semitic remarks under the context of freedom of speech. He has also said once that he was "glad to be labelled as anti-Semitic".

During 2021 Israel-Palestine crisis, former terror finance analyst at US treasury Jonathan Schanzer posted a tweet that alleged Israel Defense Force (IDF) wanted to target all Hamas operatives around the world, including Malaysia. Malaysian home ministry said that the police forces are strengthening security to maintain public order.

Commercial relations 
In 1971, Malaysian imports from Israel exceeded M$11 million while exports to Israel totalled more than M$2 million. Malaysia then imposed a ban on trade with Israel in 1974. According to the Israel–Asia Centre, trade between Israel and Malaysia is conducted through intermediate countries such as Singapore and Thailand rather than directly, due to fear of outcry by anti-Israel groups.

As negotiations between Israel and the Palestinians gained momentum in 1993, Chua Jui Meng, then Deputy Minister of International Trade and Industry, suggested in 1994 that Israel's market could eventually become a destination for Malaysian investments. On 17 September 1994, Malaysia customs seized 24,000 tons of fertilizer which was suspected to have originated from Israel. Malaysian authorities also suspected that there was a counter-boycott movement by Israeli businessmen in various countries. However, in mid-January 1996, the Malaysian Minister of International Trade and Industry was exploring the possibilities of establishing commercial relations with Israel. He said that such relation would not have any political significance. In response to this, several Malaysian businessmen went to Israel from February to May 1996 to explore business opportunities in Israel, although Malaysian boycotting of Israeli products still stood. In October 1996, a Malaysian bank named "Public Bank Berhad" enabled a direct transaction relationship with Israel's Bank Hapoalim. The Malaysian Deputy Finance minister also mentioned that Israeli businessmen were allowed to invest in Malaysia.

Between 2000 and 2001, exports to Malaysia from Israel's Intel computer chip factory in Kiryat Gat were responsible for US$600–700 million.  the trade benefits reached US$10-11 billion.

A 2002 report on Israel's trade relations with Indonesia and Malaysia from Israel's Ministry of Industry, Trade and Labour advised Israelis interested in conducting business with Malaysian companies that "there is no opposition to trade and commercial relations as long as a low profile is kept." The same report stated that Israel's Intel factory accounted for some 98% of Israel's exports to Malaysia between 1999 and 2002. Thus in 1999 Israeli exports to Malaysia were worth $107 million – $5.3 million excluding Intel. That year Israeli imports from Malaysia were worth $23.6 million. In 2000 Israeli exports to Malaysia were worth $732 million—$4.7 million excluding Intel. Israeli imports from Malaysia were worth $25.9 million. In 2001 Israeli exports to Malaysia were worth $615.5 million—$4.7 million excluding Intel. Israeli exports from Malaysia were worth $26.3 million.

Figures released by Israel's Central Bureau of Statistics showed that trade between Israel and Malaysia in 2008–2011 fluctuated considerably. In 2008, Israeli exports to Malaysia came to $30.2 million while Israel imported goods worth $100.6 million. In 2009, Israel exported $116.8 million worth of goods to Malaysia and imported goods worth $68.5 million. In 2010, Israel's exports to Malaysia grew to $798 million and imports grew to $85 million. 2011 saw Israel export goods to Malaysia worth $716.4 million and import goods worth $93.6 million. A report compiled by the European Commission indicated that in 2010 Malaysia ranked 15th among Israel's major trade partners, accounting for 0.8% (€667.6 million) of Israel's trade in that year. For Malaysia, trade with Israel is included in "Other countries" section.

Since 2014, Malaysian Non-governmental organisation (NGOs) such as Boycott Divestment and Sanctions (BDS) Malaysia, AMAN Palestine, Aqsa Syarif, Persatuan Pengguna Islam Malaysia and Viva Palestina Malaysia called for boycott of Israel-linked companies and Israeli products when Gaza–Israel conflict heightens. On 2 August 2014, "Save the Children of Gaza" was held by Viva Palestina Malaysia and Aqsa Syariff where 15,000 supporters gathered to show solidarity towards the Gaza people. Among the products boycotted include: Victoria's Secret, Starbucks, McDonald's, Nestle, Coca-Cola, Kotex, and Marks and Spencer. A study conducted in 2017 showed that Muslim counterparts is more likely to join the boycott effort when compared to non-Muslims, although there are some of them who expressed doubt on the effectiveness of boycott in hampering Israel's economy. The boycott movements also lacks organisation.

Sports 
In March 1997, Malaysian prime minister Mahathir Mohamad allowed Israel's cricket team to play in the International Cricket Council tournament in Malaysia. This was the first official visit of Israel's sports delegation to Malaysia. The entry of had sparked street demonstrations in Malaysia. To calm down the protesters, Malaysia's Foreign Minister clarified that Malaysia has no intention to establish diplomatic ties with Israel until Israel had honoured all its obligations in the treaty signed together with the Palestinians.

In February 2000, two Israeli teams took part in a table tennis tournament in Malaysia. The opposition Muslim political party, the Malaysian Islamic Party (PAS) warned the government of "undesirable consequences" and claimed that Israel is an "illegal country". However, the Malaysian minister of sports said that Malaysia should not discriminate against any country if it were to hold international sports competitions. He maintained that Malaysia still holds the same view that Israel is the oppresser against Palestine.

In 2010, Israeli boxer Ilya Grad received special permission from the country's Muslim authorities to participate in a national TV reality show on boxing. Grad is a former Israeli Muay Thai champion, the 2010 Asia champion and the second runner-up in the world championship. Grad was allowed to enter the country and received a special visa.

On 26 December 2015, the Malaysian government refused to issue visas to two Israeli windsurfers and their coach to compete at the Youth Sailing World Championships in Langkawi in early 2016; citing its policy of not having diplomatic relations with Israel. This action was criticised by both the Israel Sailing Association and the World Sailing body. On 2 January 2016, it was reported that the Malaysian government had also declined to issue visas to the Israeli table tennis team due to compete at the World Table Tennis Championships held at Kuala Lumpur in February 2016. The world governing body for the sport of sailing (created in Paris in 1906), ISAF Sailing World Championships executive decided that "all competitors from all countries" will be able to compete freely and equitably otherwise there will be prohibitions held against countries which do not allow eligible participants to compete equally.

In early January 2019, the Malaysian government barred the Israeli Paralympics swimming team from participating in the 2019 World Para Swimming Championships scheduled to be held in Kuching, Sarawak from 29 July to 4 August. On 14 January,  Prime Minister, Mahathir Mohamed reaffirmed the Malaysian government's decision to deny the Israeli team visas, citing the lack of diplomatic relations between the two countries and the ban on Israeli passport holders from entering Malaysia. On 27 January 2019, the International Paralympic Committee (IPC) stripped Malaysia of the right to host the 2019 World Para Swimming Championships. Andrew Parsons of the IPC justified the body's decision on the grounds that "politics and sports are never a good mix."

In 2021, World Squash Federation cancelled Men’s World Team Squash Championship after Malaysia banned Israeli team from playing in the country.

Education 
In 1965, there were five Malaysians who took part in courses at the Afro-Asian Institute in Israel. By 1966, no more Malaysians were sent to Israel for studies.

In March 1996, Mahathir allowed a group of 14 Israeli high school students to visit Malaysian schools and met with the education minister and other senior public officials of Malaysia. This event did not spark any public interest.

In 1998, a Malaysian took a community development course in Israel for the first time since 1965.

Travel 

On 24 October 1994, Malaysia allowed Malaysian Muslims to visit Jerusalem by entering through Jordan and not to visit other parts of Israel. Besides, the pilgrims should not stay in Israel for more than two weeks. After such announcement, Christian groups in Malaysia also demanded similar arrangements to Israel. Their request was granted on 10 November 1994. The Malaysian travel association then made an arrangement to the Israeli embassy in Singapore on Malaysian tourism to Israel. In 1995, Malaysian travel agents visited Israel. Israel's national airline, El Al, later signed an air-traffic agreement with Malaysia Airlines in the same year. In May 1995, a Malaysian television crew visited Israel. On 18 June 1995, the programme was broadcast on Malaysian television featuring an interview with an Israeli mayor named Ehud Olmert and Israeli songs in the background.

Officially, the Malaysian government allows Christians to visit Israel for religious purposes. In 2009, the government imposed a ban on visits to Israel, ostensibly due to heightened security risks posed by the Israeli–Palestinian conflict.
The ban was lifted in 2011, albeit with restrictions such as a quota of 700 pilgrims per year with not more than 40 pilgrims per church group, and pilgrims must be at least 18 years old and not visiting Israel more than once every three years with each stay a maximum of 10 days. In October 2012, the Malaysian government lifted the quota on pilgrimage tourism to Israel and allowed stays to be extended from 10 to 21 days.

Jewish settlement in Malaysia 
 

The first and only Jewish cemetery in Malaysia is known to have existed since 1805 in Penang. The first known Jew to have come to live in  Malaya was named Ezekiel Aaron Menasseh. During the Second World War, many Jews were relocated to Singapore. After the war, most of the Jews remained in Singapore or emigrated to Australia, the United States, or Israel. In 1963, only 20 Jewish families remained in Penang. The Jews stayed in Penang until the 1970s where most of them emigrated to other countries. There are now 107 tombstones in the Jewish cemetery. In 2011, David Mordecai died. He was known to be the last ethnic Jew on the Penang island. In 2013, the road next to the Jewish cemetery, known as "Jewish road" (Jalan Yahudi in Malay) was renamed to Jalan Zainal Abidin, erasing the only Jewish legacy in Malaysia.

See also 
 History of the Jews in Malaysia
 Foreign relations of Israel
 Foreign relations of Malaysia

References

External links 
 The Israel–Asia Center

 
Malaysia
Bilateral relations of Malaysia